Raymond Henry Schmandt (January 25, 1896 – February 2, 1969) was a first baseman in Major League Baseball for the St. Louis Browns (1915) and Brooklyn Robins (1918–22).

In 6 seasons, he played in 317 games and had 1,054 at bats, 122 runs, 284 hits, 36 doubles, 13 triples, 3 home runs, 122 RBI, 11 stolen bases, 46 walks, .269 batting average, .301 on-base percentage, .337 slugging percentage, 355 total bases and 31 sacrifice hits. With the Robins, he won the 1920 National League pennant.

He died in St. Louis at the age of 73.

Sources

 

1896 births
1969 deaths
Major League Baseball first basemen
Baseball players from St. Louis
St. Louis Browns players
Brooklyn Robins players
Minor league baseball managers
Bloomington Bloomers players
Lincoln Links players
Houston Buffaloes players
Indianapolis Indians players
Memphis Chickasaws players
Savannah Indians players
Canton Terriers players
Quincy Indians players
Burials at Calvary Cemetery (St. Louis)